Appledore Shipbuilders is a shipbuilder in Appledore, North Devon, England.

History

The Appledore Yard was founded in 1855 on the estuary of the River Torridge. The Richmond Dry Dock was built in 1856 by William Yeo and named after Richmond Bay on the coast of Prince Edward Island in Canada, where the Yeo family's shipping fleet was based.

The business was led by Philip Kelly Harris during the early part of the 20th century and known as P.K. Harris & Sons until 1963, when it became Appledore Shipbuilders.

In 1964 the company was acquired by Court Line, a shipping and airline business. A new shipyard was built on a greenfield site in Appledore at a cost of about £4m, opening for business in 1970. Court Line collapsed in 1974 and Appledore Shipbuilders was nationalised, subsequently being subsumed into British Shipbuilders. By the late 1980s the only yards still held in state ownership were the smaller Appledore and Ferguson yards. In 1989, Appledore Shipbuilders was sold to Langham Industries.

The first s was commissioned in May 2014. In June 2014, the Irish government took up the option for the third ship to be built at Appledore (delivered in 2016) and ordered a fourth in 2016 (delivered in 2018).

In October 2003, the Appledore shipyard went into receivership, and in early 2004 was acquired by DML, the operators of Devonport dockyard. The company was reconstituted as Appledore Shipbuilders (2004) Limited and was run by the DML subsidiary DML Appledore. During this period the yard's main activity was the installation of machinery packages and other systems for luxury yachts for Devonport Yachts Ltd.

In June 2007, Babcock International Group acquired DML, including its operations at the Appledore Shipyard, renaming them Babcock Marine Appledore. A Royal Navy contract secured 300 jobs in Appledore until 2015. The Appledore yard constructed elements of the two s. The yard then built flight deck sponsons and centre blocks for Queen Elizabeth. From 2012, Appledore built similar sections for Queen Elizabeths sister ship .

Babcock announced in November 2018 that it had no future for the shipyard, which closed on 15 March 2019.

In August 2020, InfraStrata (owners of Belfast shipyard Harland and Wolff) bought the dormant shipyard for £7 million. The deal saw the shipyard renamed H&W Appledore.

In July 2022, the shipyard won a £55 million contract to refit former Royal Navy mine-hunting ship  which is expected to be passed to the Lithuanian navy in 2024.

Ships built at Appledore
The company built more than 350 vessels, including small and medium-sized military craft, bulk carriers, LPG carriers,  superyachts, ferries, and oil-industry support vessels. Specific ships include:

References

Companies based in Devon
Shipbuilding companies of England
Former defence companies of the United Kingdom
1855 establishments in England
2019 disestablishments in England
Industrial archaeological sites in Devon
Vehicle manufacturing companies disestablished in 2019
Manufacturing companies established in 1855
British Shipbuilders